Héctor Emanuel Montalvo Domínguez (born January 19, 1998) is an American soccer player who most recently played as a defender for North Texas SC in USL League One.

Career
Montalvo joined the FC Dallas academy aged fifteen years old, before spending one year at Grand Canyon University in 2016. Montalvo opted to leave college early and joined Liga MX side Tigres UANL on a professional deal on December 20, 2016.

On February 18, 2019, Montalvo returned to Dallas, joining their USL League One affiliate side North Texas SC.

References

External links
 
 Profile at Grand Canyon Athletics

1998 births
Living people
American soccer players
Association football defenders
Grand Canyon Antelopes men's soccer players
Tigres UANL footballers
North Texas SC players
Soccer players from El Paso, Texas
USL League One players
United States men's youth international soccer players
American expatriate sportspeople in Mexico
American expatriate soccer players
Expatriate footballers in Mexico